Jordan Geoffrey Cropper (born 12 May 2000) is an English professional footballer who plays as a defender for Barnet on loan from EFL League Two side Grimsby Town.

He initially played for non-league side Ilkeston before joining the Burnley youth academy. He signed his first professional contract in 2019 and spent two spells on loan with Chesterfield before joining Grimsby Town in March 2022.

Career

Early career
Born in Nottingham, Cropper came through the youth ranks at Derbyshire-based non-league side Ilkeston initially playing as a striker, making his first team debut at the age of 16 in a Northern Premier League game against Mickleover Sports on Boxing Day 2016.

Burnley
In March 2017 he joined Premier League side Burnley as an academy player. In September 2017 he scored a hattrick for the under-18's in a game against Sheffield Wednesday.

In April 2019, Cropper signed his first professional contract. On 10 January 2020, Cropper joined Chesterfield on loan for the remainder of the 2019–20 season.

On 20 August 2020, Chesterfield announced they had re-signed Cropper on a season-long loan,
although Burnley recalled him on 13 January 2021.

Cropper underwent surgery on his hamstring, that was initially expected to see him miss 4 to 5 months but ended up being absent for 9 months. At the end of the 2020–21 season, Cropper was released by Burnley.

Grimsby Town
On 25 March 2022, following a trial at the club Cropper joined National League side Grimsby Town on an initial two-month deal until the end of the season. Manager Paul Hurst mentioned “He is a player that has had an injury and is the reason why he has been in on trial. He hasn’t managed to secure something at other clubs but I am happy to have him on board."

Following an injury to regular right-back Michee Efete, Cropper had an extended run in the first team during the final months of the season. On 28 May, Grimsby defeated Wrexham 4-5 away from home in the play-off semi final. A long throw in by Cropper connected with Luke Waterfall who headed home the winner in the 119th minute after the game had gone to extra time. In the final at the London Stadium, Cropper again assisted the winner in extra time with another long throw in that resulted in Jordan Maguire-Drew scoring at the back post to send Grimsby back to the Football League at the first time of asking.

Cropper signed a new one-year contract with the Mariners ahead of their first season back in the Football League. In March 2023, he joined Barnet on loan.

Career statistics

Style of play
Cropper specialises at long throw ins which played a big part of Grimsby's promotion back to the Football League in 2022.

Honours
Grimsby Town
National League play-off winners: 2022

References

2000 births
Living people
English footballers
Association football defenders
Ilkeston F.C. players
Burnley F.C. players
Chesterfield F.C. players
Grimsby Town F.C. players
Barnet F.C. players
English Football League players
National League (English football) players
Northern Premier League players